Chilton Candover is a village in Hampshire, England. The village is situated on the main road from Basingstoke to Winchester, and consists of a few scattered houses built of brick and roofed with slate, thatch and tiles. To the north lies an underground churchyard enclosed by a flint stone wall, now abandoned and overgrown with weeds.

Its nearest railway station is the restored Watercress Line, at New Alresford.

Governance
The village of Chilton Candover is part of the civil parish of Candovers, and is part of the Upton Grey and the Candovers ward of Basingstoke and Deane borough council. The borough council is a Non-metropolitan district of Hampshire County Council.

See also

 Brown Candover
 Preston Candover

References

External links
 Chilton Candover History
 History of Chilton Candover - Basingstoke and Deane

Villages in Hampshire